Kelvyn Park High School is a public 4–year high school located in the Hermosa neighborhood on north-west side of Chicago, Illinois, United States. Opened in 1933, Kelvyn Park is operated by the Chicago Public Schools (CPS) district. In addition to being a neighborhood high school, Kelvyn Park also serves as a middle school with seventh and eighth grades. Kelvyn Park attendance boundaries extends to the Logan Square, Cragin and Belmont Gardens neighborhoods.

History
Kelvyn Park began as an elementary school in 1918. Before that time, the land contained 19 portable units that were connected to Nixon Elementary School. In 1925, a junior high school was organized in the building to relieve pressure at Carl Schurz High School, which was overcrowded at the time. In 1927, some of the Kelvyn Park elementary students were phased-out to the newly constructed Barry Elementary School. 

In 1933, Kelvyn Park became a high school; however, elementary students remained until 1936. Historically, the school had been populated by students of primarily European-American descent. By the early–1970's, Kelvyn Park witnessed a significant demographic shift with the arrival of Latin–Americans in the surrounding community. Kelvyn Park's Hispanic population had increased more than four-fold by the 1977–1978 school year. 

Kelvyn Park has been converted into a 7–12 grade school to compensate for the loss of Ames Middle School which is being converted into the Marine Math and Science Academy. The conversion of Ames is considered controversial among community stakeholders and is currently being contested.

Demographics
As of the 2022–2023 school year, 87.1% of Kelvyn Park's student body is Hispanic, 8.9% African-American, 2.8% White and 1.2% Other. Low-income students make up 82.7% of Kelvyn Parks' student body. Kelvyn Park has a 64% graduation rate.

Athletics
Kelvyn Park competes in the Chicago Public League (CPL) and is a member of the Illinois High School Association (IHSA). Their sport teams are stylized and named the Panthers. Kelvyn Park boys' basketball team were Public League champions for the 1942–43 season and were regional champions in 1935–36 under the coaching of Phil Brownstein. Boys' volleyball were regional champions twice (2002–03 and 2003–04).

Clubs and athletics

Boys/Girls Basketball
Band
Cheerleader
Boys/Girls Cross Country
Pom-Pom
Boys/Girls Soccer
Wrestling
Boys/Girls Track
Boys/Girls Volleyball
Boys Baseball
Girls softball

Other Information
Kelvyn Park was the subject of a 1979 PBS news special (which aired locally in Chicago on WTTW) called As We See It, a short documentary created by Kelvyn Park students about desegeration of the school (which at the time Kelvyn Park's student body was changing from predominantly White to Hispanic) and student life at the school.

Notable alumni
Gordie Gillespie (1944) – College baseball, football and basketball coach (Lewis University, Ripon College, University of St. Francis).
Michael Gross (1964) – actor, (Family Ties, Tremors).

References

External links
 Kelvyn Park High School Website
 Trulia: Kelyvn Park High School

Public high schools in Chicago
Educational institutions established in 1918
Educational institutions established in 1933
1933 establishments in Illinois